The Man Next Door is a 2010 Argentine film directed by Mariano Cohn and Gastón Duprat. It was nominated for the 2010 Goya Award for Best Spanish Language Foreign Film.

Synopsis 
A story that exposes a clash between neighbors, and how these neighbors deal with their differences. The movie opens with a scene of a sledge hammer creating a hole on a wall that serves as a divider between the houses of two men. On one side of the screen is pure darkness, while light sheds through the hole on the wall on the other side. This contrast of light and darkness symbolizes the two different worlds of the protagonists. Leonardo (Rafael Spregelburd) is a rich and successful designer with a passion for architecture. On the other hand, Victor (Daniel Aráoz) is a used car salesman who is rough around the edges. The conflict of the movie arises when Leonardo discovers that Victor is building a window on the dividing wall. Leonardo claims that this window is illegal and that it violates his privacy because it is openly facing his living room; however, Victor declares that he just needs a little bit of sunlight, which Leonardo has received plenty of in his glass home. Throughout the movie, the men argue back and forth about the window and the problem seems irresolvable.

Cast  
 Rafael Spregelburd as Leonardo Kachanovsky
 Daniel Aráoz as Víctor Chubelo
 Eugenia Alonso as Ana Kachanovsky
 Inés Budassi as Lola
 Loren Acuña as Elba
 Eugenio Scopel as Uncle Carlos
 Débora Zanolli as Fabiana
 Bárbara Hang as Friend at dinner
 Juan Cruz Bordeu as Friend at dinner

Location
The film was entirely shot at the Casa Curutchet (Curutchet House), the only residential house designed and built by the famous Swiss-French architect Le Corbusier in the Americas. The film takes place in La Plata, Argentina.

Accolades
The movie won the Best Argentine Feature Film prize at the 24º Mar del Plata Film Festival in Argentina, the Best Cinematography Award in the World Dramatic Competition at the 2010 Sundance Film Festival, and it was selected to participate at The Lincoln Center Film Society’s and MoMA’s 2010 New Directors/New Films Festival in New York, USA. The film also won awards for Best Movie, Best Direction, and Best Original Script at Premios Sur in 2011.

External links

2010 films
2010s Spanish-language films
2010 drama films
Argentine drama films
Films directed by Gastón Duprat and Mariano Cohn
2010s Argentine films